Eesti Üleüldise teaduse raamat ehk encyklopädia konversationi-lexikon is an Estonian encyclopedia, written by Karl August Hermann between 1900 and 1906. Only two volumes (1903, 1906) were published before Hermann died in 1909.

References

Estonian encyclopedias
Estonian books
1900s in Estonia
1903 non-fiction books
1906 non-fiction books
20th-century encyclopedias